Invasion is the second album by Canadian hip hop duo Dragon Fli Empire, released in 2005 on Makebelieve Records. It was viewed as a progression in the duo's sound and features guest artists from Calgary, Edmonton, Vancouver, Toronto, Tacoma and Portland. Several tracks were included in different CD compilations. The track "Roc the Crowd" (featuring and produced by Ohmega Watts) was released as a 12" vinyl single on Bigfoot Records in 2007.

Music video

A video for the track "Our Way" was directed by Ramin Eshraghi-Yazdi, featuring the Calgary breakdancing crew Original Rudes.

Track listing

(Note: Tracks 16-18 are listed as FAS Krew Bonus Kuts)

References

2005 albums
Dragon Fli Empire albums